Danijal Brkovic (born 3 June 1991) is a Bosnian-American footballer who plays as a forward for SG Westend Frankfurt in Germany.

Early years
Born in Dubrovnik, Croatia, Brković moved to Binghamton, New York when he was 9-years old, and eventually became an American citizen. Playing for the Johnson City High School, Brković found success as a centre-forward and as a winger. After high school, he decided not to go to the college and instead went to Europe in hopes of becoming a professional player.

Club career
Brkovic first played with FK Velez's youth team, on his mother native city, Mostar, and in late 2010, he signed a professional contract with the team.

Brković professional debut was on April 9, 2011, in a league match against NK Zvijezda Gradačac when he came in the game's 67th minute replacing Damir Rovčanin.

In February 2019, Brković moved to Sweden and joined IFK Åmål.

References

External links
 
 
 Danijal Brković at FuPa

1991 births
Living people
Sportspeople from Dubrovnik
Association football forwards
Bosnia and Herzegovina footballers
American soccer players
FK Velež Mostar players
FK Željezničar Sarajevo players
FK Olimpik players
NK Čelik Zenica players
FK Radnik Bijeljina players
IFK Åmål players
Premier League of Bosnia and Herzegovina players
Landesliga players
Division 2 (Swedish football) players
Bosnia and Herzegovina expatriate footballers
Expatriate footballers in Germany
Bosnia and Herzegovina expatriate sportspeople in Germany
Expatriate footballers in Sweden
Bosnia and Herzegovina expatriate sportspeople in Sweden